Helen Boyle (28 August 1908 – 17 September 1970) was a British swimmer. She competed in the women's 100 metre backstroke event at the 1924 Summer Olympics.

References

External links
 

1908 births
1970 deaths
British female swimmers
Olympic swimmers of Great Britain
Swimmers at the 1924 Summer Olympics
Place of birth missing
Female backstroke swimmers